Constance D'Arcy may refer to:

Constance Elizabeth D'Arcy, Australian obstetrician-gynaecologist; university administrator
Ella D'Arcy, English author, born Constance D'Arcy
Constance D'Arcy Mackay, American author